Karsina  (German Karzin) is a village in the administrative district of Gmina Polanów, within Koszalin County, West Pomeranian Voivodeship, in north-western Poland. 

The village has a population of 30.

Notable residents
 Kasimir Wedig von Bonin (1691–1752), Prussian lieutenant general

References

Karsina